Vysokopillia or Vysokopillya is an urban-type settlement in Beryslav Raion, Kherson Oblast, southern Ukraine. It hosts the administration of Vysokopillia settlement hromada, one of the hromadas of Ukraine. It has a population of 

During the 2022 Russian invasion of Ukraine, Vysokopillia became the administrational center of Kherson Oblast, while trying to take control of Kherson city.

Administrative status 
Until 18 July 2020, Vysokopillia was the administrative centre of Vysokopillia Raion. The raion was abolished in July 2020 as part of the administrative reform of Ukraine, which reduced the number of raions of Kherson Oblast to five. The area of Vysokopillia Raion was merged into Beryslav Raion.

History 

On March the area was occupied by Russia. According to a tweet by Visegrad24, Ukrainian military forces recaptured Vysokopillia on 4 September and hoisted the Ukrainian flag near Vysokopillia's hospital as part the 2022 Ukrainian southern counteroffensive.

Economy

Transportation
Vysokopillia is on a paved road which connects Novovorontsovka and Beryslav, where it has access to Kherson.

Vysokopillia railway station is on the railway line connecting Apostolove and Snihurivka (with further connection to Kherson and Mykolaiv).

See also 
 Battle of Kherson
 2022 Ukrainian southern counteroffensive

References

Urban-type settlements in Beryslav Raion